Friedrich Strasser was born in Austria.  He became a painter. He then participated in the 1848 revolution in Austria.  In 1849 he became a lieutenant-colonel in the Baden-Palatinate insurgent army.

References

Year of birth missing
Year of death missing
19th-century Austrian painters
19th-century Austrian male artists
Austrian male painters
Austrian soldiers